John Wogan (1588–1644) was a Welsh politician.

John Wogan may also refer to:

John Wogan (Justiciar of Ireland) (died 1321)
John Wogan (MP died 1557), MP for Pembrokeshire
John Wogan (MP died 1580) (1538–1580), MP for Pembrokeshire
John B. Wogan (1890–1968), U.S. Army general